Geophysical dynamics may refer to:
 Geodynamics, the study of the dynamics of the Earth's mantle and core
 Geophysical fluid dynamics, the study of large-scale fluid motions in the ocean and atmosphere